Teafuone is an islet of Nukufetau, Tuvalu. Teafuone has also been known as Entrance Island as it is by the channel through the reef of Nukufetau.

References

Islands of Tuvalu
Pacific islands claimed under the Guano Islands Act
Nukufetau